Tiputinia is a genus of myco-heterotrophic plants in the family Burmanniaceae, first described as a genus in 2007. There is only one known species, Tiputinia foetida, formerly thought to be endemic to eastern Ecuador, new records from Peru suggest that the distribution is more widespread than formerly thought. The plant is mycotrophic, i.e. lacking chlorophyll and obtaining sustenance from fungi in the soil.

References

Monotypic Dioscoreales genera
Burmanniaceae
Parasitic plants
Endemic flora of Ecuador